Cheung Sha Wan is an underground station located underneath Cheung Sha Wan Road in Sham Shui Po District on the  of Hong Kong MTR, between  and . It was opened on 17 May 1982. The station's colour is Yellow brown.

The station was originally planned with the name So Uk, and the station is close to the Lei Cheng Uk Han Tomb Museum.

History
On 10 May 1982, Tsuen Wan line opened to the public, but Cheung Sha Wan station did not open to the public until 17 May, a week later.

Station layout

Entrances/Exits
A1/A2/A3: Cheung Sha Wan Road
B: Fat Tsueng Street, Cheung Sha Wan Playground, IVE (WHK) 
C1: Wing Lung Street
C2: Un Chau Estate

References

Cheung Sha Wan
MTR stations in Kowloon
Tsuen Wan line
Railway stations in Hong Kong opened in 1982